Salegentibacter flavus is a Gram-negative and non-motile bacterium from the genus of Salegentibacter which has been isolated from sediments from the Chazhma Bay.

References

Flavobacteria
Bacteria described in 2006